Casimir "Hippo" Gozdowski (March 26, 1902 – September 19, 1952) was an American football fullback for the Toledo Maroons of the National Football League. Nicknamed "Hippo" because of his large size, Gozdowski was a well-known athlete in Toledo, playing professional and semi-professional football and baseball for many years in the city.

Early life 
Casimir Gozdowski was born on March 26, 1902, in Chicago, Illinois, but had moved to Toledo, Ohio by the time he reached his twenties.

Football career 
In 1922, Gozdowski played for the Toledo Maroons of the National Football League, which at the time was only three years old and had just begun to call itself the NFL.

Gozdowski had not played college football, unlike most of the starters on the team. He played backup to starting right guard Cap Edwards.

Gozdowski's most prolific game saw him score two rushing touchdowns in a 39–0 rout of the Louisville Brecks, in which the Brecks failed to even get a first down.

Baseball career 
In 1925, Gozdowski played pitcher for a Toledo semi-professional baseball team called the Eagles. Described as "a big Polish boy" and likened to Babe Ruth by the Sandusky Star-Journal, he was considered far and away the best player on the team.

Later life and death 
Gozdowski died in Toledo on September 19, 1952, at the age of 50.

References 

1902 births
1952 deaths

American football fullbacks
American people of Polish descent
Baseball players from Ohio
Toledo Maroons players
Players of American football from Ohio